= Legend of Zord =

2003 video game

- Developer(s): Imaginations FZ LLC
- Publisher(s): BMS Modern Games Handelsagentur GmbH, Imaginations FZ LLC, enjoy Software & Entertainment GmbH, Media-Service 2000
- Platform(s): Windows
- Genre(s): Action-adventure
- Mode(s): Single-player

Legend of Zord is a 2003 action-adventure game for the PC, developed by Imaginations FZ LLC.

== Plot ==
5000 years ago the land of Zord is ruled by the wise king Gilgamesh. Jealous of Zord's wealth, the king of the bordering kingdom of Askhar invokes a demon to kill all the inhabitants of Zord. Prince Raymond survives the attack and goes on a quest to avenge his family.

== Gameplay ==
Legend of Zord is a third-person action-adventure game. The player walks through 16 levels, fighting enemies. The player can choose between six weapons and 18 spells. Later in the game the player can choose to switch to different characters, and transform into a lion or a hawk.
